Matthias Weichert (born in 1955) is a German operatic baritone and vocal teacher.

Life and career 
Born in Frankenberg, Weichert attended the St. Thomas School, Leipzig from 1965 to 1974. Subsequently, he studied singing at the Hochschule für Musik Carl Maria von Weber until 1981. He was also a guest at the Komische Oper Berlin, the Staatsoper Berlin and the Leipzig Opera. Since 2000 he has been a freelance concert and oratorio singer.

References

External links 
 Matthias Weichert on Operissimo
 Matthias Weichert Homepage
 Hochschule - Prof. Matthias Weichert
 
 

1955 births
Living people
People from Frankenberg, Saxony
German operatic baritones
Voice teachers
20th-century German male opera singers
21st-century German male opera singers
Academic staff of the Hochschule für Musik Carl Maria von Weber
People educated at the St. Thomas School, Leipzig
Hochschule für Musik Carl Maria von Weber alumni